There are over 9,000 Grade I listed buildings in England.  This page is a list of these buildings in the county of Herefordshire.

County of Herefordshire

|}

See also
 :Category:Grade I listed buildings in Herefordshire
 Grade II* listed buildings in Herefordshire

Notes

References 
National Heritage List for England

External links

 
Herefordshire
Lists of listed buildings in Herefordshire